Nurbol Zhumaskaliyev (Nūrbol Jūmasqaliev) is a retired Kazakh football attacking midfielder and forward, and former manager of FC Tobol.

Career

Early career
At the age of 11, Nurbol was selected for a youth club, Namys (Almaty), which was created to find the most promising talents in the nation. His first coach was Talgat Nurmagambetov.

Club career
Nurbol started his senior career at FC Akzhayik and played for FC Zhetysu in next season. In 2000 Nurbol moved to FC Tobol, where he soon became the club captain. He scored 7 goals in European competitions.

After being sent-off on 16 October 2016 in Tobol's 1–0 defeat to Akzhayik for foul and abusive language, Zhumaskaliyev received a seven-match ban. Zhumaskaliyev went on to leave Tobol in December 2016.

On 30 June 2017, Zhumaskaliyev left Irtysh Pavlodar by mutual consent.

On 27 December 2018, FC Tobol announced Zhumaskaliyev as their new Sporting Director.

International
At the age of 20, Nurbol earned his first cap on 16 October 2001 in a friendly against Estonia. He was dropped initially during the World Cup 2006 qualifiers, in favour of Ruslan Baltiev, but regained his place when Baltiev was injured.

Career statistics

Club

International

Statistics accurate as of match played 7 June 2016

International goals

Honours

Club
Tobol
Kazakhstan Premier League (1): 2010
Kazakhstan Cup (1): 2007
UEFA Intertoto Cup (1): 2007

Personal
 2003, 2005, 2010 Kazakhstan FF "Best Player of the year"

References

External links 

1981 births
Living people
Association football midfielders
Association football forwards
Kazakhstani footballers
Kazakhstan international footballers
Kazakhstan Premier League players
FC Tobol players
FC Akzhayik players
FC Zhetysu players
FC Astana players
People from Oral, Kazakhstan